The Milltown Dam is a hydroelectric dam built on the St. Croix River between St. Stephen, New Brunswick, Canada and Calais, Maine, USA, and operated by NB Power. Its power house has a capacity of 4 megawatts with its 7 turbines. Built in 1881 and modernised in the early-1900s, it is the oldest hydroelectric dam in Canada, as well as the first hydroelectric facility built by NB Power. Electricity generated by the Milltown Dam is also exported to the United States, connected to a 69,000 volt transmission circuit owned by the Eastern Maine Electric Cooperative, an electric utility serving Calais.

References

External links

NB Power
Eastern Maine Electric Cooperative

NB Power
Dams in Maine
Dams in New Brunswick
Hydroelectric power stations in New Brunswick
Buildings and structures in Washington County, Maine
1881 establishments in New Brunswick
1881 establishments in Maine
Dams completed in 1881